Peter Byrne (13 June 1892 – 16 March 1974) was a member of the Queensland Legislative Assembly.

Early life
Byrne was born at Myola, Queensland, the son of Peter Byrne Snr and his wife Mary (née McCoy). He was educated at the Mareeba State School and then attended Nudgee College in Brisbane. On leaving school he found work at the Chillagoe smelters before becoming a canegrower in Tully from 1925. He was also a tax agent and, during the 1930s, helped many farmers who had been declared bankrupt get back on their feet again.

On 7 May 1923 Byrne married Ellen Elsiba Imison but Ellen died just three years later, the marriage bring two sons. Six years after his first marriage Byrne married for a second time, to Amy Jean Scott on 4 November 1929 (died 1967) and together they had three daughters. Byrne died in March 1974 and was buried in the Pinnaroo Lawn Cemetery.

Public life
At the 1950 Queensland state election Byrne, for the Labor Party, won the new seat of Mourilyan. He was the member for Mourilyan until the 1969 Queensland state election when he retired from politics.

References

Members of the Queensland Legislative Assembly
1892 births
1974 deaths
Burials at Pinnaroo Cemetery, Brisbane
Australian Labor Party members of the Parliament of Queensland
20th-century Australian politicians